Finland competed at the 2019 World Aquatics Championships in Gwangju, South Korea from 12 to 28 July.

Diving

Finland entered three divers.

Women

Swimming

Finland has entered seven swimmers.

Men

Women

References

Nations at the 2019 World Aquatics Championships
Finland at the World Aquatics Championships
2019 in Finnish sport